"Ain't She Sweet" is a song composed by Milton Ager, with lyrics by Jack Yellen. It was published in 1927 by Ager, Yellen & Bornstein, Inc. It became popular in the first half of the 20th century and typified the Roaring Twenties. Like Happy Days Are Here Again (1929), it became a Tin Pan Alley standard. Both Ager and Yellen were elected to the Songwriters Hall of Fame.

Milton Ager wrote Ain't She Sweet for his daughter Shana Ager, who in her adult life was known as the political commentator Shana Alexander.

Recorded versions

Ain't She Sweet was also recorded by Fabian Forte, Hoosier Hot Shots, Ray Anthony, Nat King Cole, Tiny Hill , The Playboys, The Viscounts, and Frankie Lymon. The song was also covered in 1990 on the album Funk of Ages by Bernie Worrell and several former members of Parliament-Funkadelic.

Versions by the Beatles

The Beatles regularly performed the song live from 1957 to 1962. According to Beatles historian Mark Lewisohn, "John [Lennon] may have known the song through his mother; he certainly knew it from Gene Vincent's 1956 recording on the LP Bluejean Bop!" In The Beatles as Musicians, Walter Everett offers a similar assessment, writing simply that it was "based on Gene Vincent's record." Musicologist and writer Ian MacDonald also agrees with this view. Lewisohn further notes that, "John Lennon's vocal rendition was different from Vincent's, it would seem that he arranged his own unique version... He may have also been influenced by Duffy Power's 1959 version". In the Beatles' Anthology book, McCartney recalls that "Songs like 'Till There Was You' and 'Ain't She Sweet' would be the late-night cabaret material. They showed that we weren't just another rock'n'roll group."

Recording

On June 22 or 24, 1961, during their first professional recording session, the Beatles recorded a cover of "Ain't She Sweet". Recorded at the Friedrich-Ebert-Halle in Hamburg, Germany, produced by Bert Kaempfert and engineered by Karl Hinze, the session saw the Beatles backing Tony Sheridan. George Harrison later recalled that the group misunderstood the purpose of the recording session and only learned upon arrival that they would be backing Sheridan. Harrison further added, "It was a bit disappointing because we'd been hoping to get a record deal as ourselves." "Ain't She Sweet" was one of two songs recorded without Sheridan with Lennon instead on lead vocal. In 1968, Lennon reflected, "We thought it would be easy: the Germans had such shitty records, ours was bound to be better." MacDonald surmised that the Beatles decided to record a cover to save their stronger originals, such as McCartney's "Like Dreamers Do" and Lennon's "Hello Little Girl".

In a 1975 radio interview, Lennon explained that Gene Vincent's cover was "very mellow and very high pitched, and I used to do it like that, but they said harder, harder—you know, Germans all want it a bit more like a march—so we ended up doing a harder version of it." Lewisohn remarks that Lennon "gives it a good and powerful go, but there's a strange timbre to his voice, as if he was suffering from 'Hamburg throat' while also straining to deliver Kaempfert's brittle sound on a song that didn't suit it." Everett describes Lennon's singing style as "very detached, slightly hiccuping" and notes his use of a mordent for emphasis. Lewisohn further evaluated that Pete Best's drumming "lacks imagination" and McCartney's "bass is accomplished." Harrison's guitar solo "judged even in its place and time... wasn't good." Everett comments that, "as a whole, these recordings are hardly representative of the future Beatles." MacDonald judges it similarly, writing, "...it ["Ain't She Sweet"] made little sense as a choice for the Beatles' first professional recording and fails to reward attention in hindsight." In The Cambridge Companion to the Beatles, Howard Kramer writes that the session was "musically unspectacular" and "the Beatles' instrumental backing shows competence, but little more."

Release

After the session, the Beatles expected that a single of "Ain't She Sweet" b/w "Beatle Bop" would be released in America, Germany and Britain in the weeks that followed. It was not until October 23, 1961 that a single was released in West Germany exclusively, except it was instead "My Bonnie" b/w "The Saints", credited as "Tony Sheridan & The Beat Brothers". The Liverpool music newspaper Mersey Beat reported that the Beatles were dissatisfied with "Ain't She Sweet" and "Cry For A Shadow" and so sold their rights back to Kaempfert's company, Bert Kaempfert Produktion (BKP). Polydor's first worldwide release of "Ain't She Sweet" was on the February 1964 French EP, . Polydor released it in the U.K. as a single on May 29, 1964 b/w "If You Love Me, Baby", a mistitling of the Jimmy Reed song "Take Out Some Insurance". On July 6, 1964 ATCO Records released the track as a single in America b/w the Hank Snow song "Nobody's Child". In August 1964, the song peaked at number 19 on the US Billboard Hot 100. In Sweden, it reached number 4 on Sweden's Kvällstoppen Chart and also reached the top spot on the Tio i Topp chart.  It was the highest-charting Beatles single with original drummer Pete Best. The Beatles were neither paid nor owed royalty payments for the release. The track has been included on several releases, including Ain't She Sweet (1964), The Beatles' First (1964) and In the Beginning (Circa 1960) (1970). The Beatles included the recording on the 1995 compilation album Anthology 1.

On 24 July 1969 during a recording session for "Sun King"/"Mean Mr. Mustard", Lennon began an impromptu jam of "Ain't She Sweet" along with the other Gene Vincent songs, "Who Slapped John?" and "Be-Bop-a-Lula". Lewisohn remarked that this version was more in the style of Gene Vincent than the Beatles' original 1961 version. The Beatles included this version of "Ain't She Sweet" on the 1996 compilation album Anthology 3.

Personnel

According to Ian MacDonald:

The Beatles
John Lennon– lead vocal, rhythm guitar
Paul McCartney– bass guitar
George Harrison– lead guitar
Pete Best– drums

Charts and certifications

Weekly charts

Film appearances 
 Hazel Green & Company, a Warner Bros./Vitaphone musical short (1927)
 In January 1928, a short film of Ain't She Sweet sung by Chili Bouchier was filmed in the DeForest Phonofilm sound-on-film process
 Duck Soup (Paramount Pictures, 1933)
 Margie (Twentieth Century Fox, 1946)
 You Were Meant for Me (Twentieth Century Fox, 1948)
 You're My Everything (Twentieth Century Fox, 1949)
 Force of Arms (Warner Brothers, 1951)
 Strangers on a Train (Warner Brothers, 1951)
 Feed the Kitty (1952)  Merrie Melodies cartoon
 East of Eden (Warner Brothers, 1955)
 The Eddy Duchin Story (Columbia Pictures, 1955)
 Picnic (MGM, 1955)
 Miss Mary (1986)
 Midnight in Paris (Sony Pictures Classics, 2011)

TV appearances
 The Beverly Hillbillies Season 1, Episode 8: "Jethro Goes To School" (Sung by Phil Gordon (actor)) (1962)
 Coronation Street Sung by Sylvia Goodwin and others
 All in the Family, Season 5, Episode 1:  "The Bunkers and Inflation", Part 1 (1974)
 House M.D. Season 2, Episode 9: "Deception"
 You Rang, M'Lord? Season 2, Episode 5: "The Wounds of War"
 Heartbeat (UK TV series) Series 16, Episode 12: "Vendetta" (2007)
 Bunheads Season 1, Episode 1: "Pilot" (2012)
 Being Human Season 4, Episode 5:The Honeymooners

Notes

References

Sources

 
 
 
 
 
 
 
 
 
 
 
 

1927 songs
Eddie Cantor songs
The Beatles songs
American songs
Songs written by Jack Yellen
Songs with music by Milton Ager
1964 singles
Polydor Records singles
The Beatles with Tony Sheridan songs
Jazz compositions in C major
Articles containing video clips
Atco Records singles
Music published by MPL Music Publishing
Number-one singles in Sweden